Cape Verdean football clubs have participated in African football competitions since 1992 when Sporting Praia took part in the African Club of Championships Clubs. In total, six Cape Verdean clubs have participated in African  competitions, only one SC Atlético was disqualified as the federation did not name their entrant on time. Only Sporting, Boavista and Travadores, the top three of Praia competed more than once in its competitions, of which Sporting and Travadores are the only ones who competed more than once at the championships and Boavista in two of its continental competitions. The biggest success was the First Round of continental championships, Sporting in 1992, Boavista in 1996 and again Sporting in 2008.

The last appearance of a Cape Verdean club at CAF competitions was in 2009, due to financial concerns and minimal scheduling difficulties, neither club have qualified into the CAF Champions League.  Never any Cape Verdean club competed at the CAF Confederation Cup, founded in 2004 after the merger of both CAF Cup Winners' Cup and the CAF Cup.  Even that the Cape Verdean Cup were held in 2007, 2009, 2010 and in 2012, neither club qualified into the CAF Confederation Cup due to financial problems.

Cape Verde has recently become one of the African nations who had the least participations at the CAF competitions, one of the nations such as Chad who first competed nearly the same time in the 1990s has more presentations at CAF Competitions than in Cape Verde.  One example that Cape Verde has more appearances at the CAF competitions is they have more than São Tomè and Príncipe.

No announcement has recently been made for the national champion to compete in the upcoming 2018 CAF Champions League.

Appearances in CAF competitions

African Cup of Champions Clubs/CAF Champions League

African (CAF) Cup Winner's Cup/CAF Confederation Cup

CAF Cup

1 SC Atlético was disqualified as the federation did not name its entrant in time
1 Sporting Praia withdrew
2 Sporting Praia withdrew due to the Guinean Civil War that was taking place that year

References

Football in Cape Verde
African football clubs in international competitions